Anne "Annie" Haeger (born February 5, 1990) is an American sailor who competed at the 2016 Summer Olympics.

Life
Haeger was born in East Troy, Wisconsin in 1990. She started sailing when she was five and she went to Lake Forest High School. She joined as a sailing team with Briana Provancha. They both graduated from Boston College in Massachusetts together in 2012, where Haeger was named ICSA Women’s College Sailor of the Year in 2011. Annie was also named US Sailor of the Year in 2015.

She and Provancha won their place at the United States at the 2016 Summer Olympics in Palma de Mallorca which recognised their competition over the previous three years.

She and Provancha appeared in the Women's 470 event in the 2016 Summer Olympics.

Private life
In 2018 she married Canadian Olympic sailor Luke Ramsay.

References

External links

 

1990 births
Living people
Boston College alumni
Boston College Eagles sailors
ICSA Women’s College Sailor of the Year
US Sailor of the Year
Olympic sailors of the United States
Sailors at the 2016 Summer Olympics – 470
People from East Troy, Wisconsin
Sportspeople from Wisconsin